The 2000 Karl Schäfer Memorial (also known as the Vienna Cup) took place from October 4 through 7th, 2000. Skaters competed in the disciplines of men's singles, ladies' singles, and pair skating.

Results

Men

Ladies

Pairs

External links
 results

Karl Schäfer Memorial
Karl Schafer Memorial, 2000
Karl Schafer Memorial